Pterodactyl Woman from Beverly Hills, made by Ptereo Pictures Inc. and Troma Entertainment in 1995, is a live-action farcical horror film, written and directed by Philippe Mora. The film stars Beverly D'Angelo, Aron Eisenberg and Brion James. Australian entertainer Barry Humphries has a cameo, playing three parts in the same scene: a grocery store clerk, the store manager and a "lady shopper" who is clearly his stage character Dame Edna Everage. The film had a limited cinematic release in January 1996 and was released on video by Troma in 1997.

Plot
Paleontologist Dick Chandler (Brad Wilson) discovers a dinosaur egg, prompting an eccentric witchdoctor named Salvador Dalí (Brion James) to put a curse on Chandler's wife, Pixie (Beverly D'Angelo), causing her to slowly and intermittently transform into a pterodactyl. After Pixie lays an egg, Dick tracks down Salvador Dalí and apologizes, and the curse is lifted.

Cast

 Beverly D'Angelo as Pixie Chandler
 Aron Eisenberg as Tommy Chandler
 Barry Humphries as Bert / Lady Shopper / Manager
 Brion James as Salvador Dalí / Sam
 Sharon Martin as Jenny Chandler
 Stephen McHattie as Dr. Egbert Drum
 Ruta Lee as Mrs. Poole
 Aleks Shaklin as Dr. Zavenbrot
 Ron Soble as Pablo Picasso
 Eddie Wilde as Janensch
 Brad Wilson as Dick Chandler
 Moon Zappa as Susie
 Carmine Zozzora as Dr. Harold Harold
 Jonathan Ball as Officer Othello
 Cabiria Cardinale as Karen / Mrs. Goldberg
 Holley Chant as Mrs. Hoffman 
 Francesca Hilton as Helene

Music
The film's music was composed by Roy Hay, the guitarist/keyboardist of British band Culture Club.

Critical reception
Critics panned Pterodactyl Woman from Beverly Hills for being dull and unfunny. Variety magazine's review declared "all the actors ... are defeated by the drab material". The film was also criticized for being a "classic case of a title in search of a movie", unable to decide whether it seeks to spoof Los Angeles lifestyles or the science fiction genre.

Entertainment Weekly gave the film a C- and noted that "silly isn’t necessarily funny, and after an hour and a half of Bev’s squawking and stooping, you may find yourself wishing this species of movie were extinct."

The Dinosaur Filmography book describes the film as "a wildly uneven hodgepodge of sight gags, satire, and silliness, with just enough cleverness and intelligence to avoid laying an egg."

References

External links

1997 films
Troma Entertainment films
1996 comedy films
1996 films
American comedy films
Films directed by Philippe Mora
1997 comedy films
1990s English-language films
1990s American films